Potosi was a five-masted steel barque built in 1895 by Joh. C. Tecklenborg ship yard in Geestemünde, Germany, for the sailing ship company F. Laeisz as a trading vessel. Its primary purpose was as a "nitrate clipper" collecting guano in South America for use in chemical companies in Germany (mainly for making explosives and fertiliser). As its shipping route was between Germany and Chile, it was designed to be capable of withstanding the rough weather encountered around Cape Horn.

Potosi was named after the Bolivian town of Potosí (the highest city in the world), its name beginning with "P" according to a Laeisz' tradition begun in the 1880s. The Potosi and sister ships became known as the Flying P Line and were described by Robert Carter as "without doubt, the most successful fleet of sail-driven ships ever assembled under one flag..."

Potosi had five masts and was rigged as a barque, meaning that the first four masts were square-rigged, each carrying six sails, and the fifth mast carried three fore-and-aft-sails. She was the third windjammer in the world merchant fleet with that kind of rigging, after the France I of the Antoine-Dominique Bordes line of Bordeaux, and the first German (auxiliary) steel barque Maria Rickmers of the Rickmers line. In total, within the world merchant fleet, there were only six windjammers of this class of five-masted barque rigging, with four masts having carried five, six or partly seven sails on each mast: France I, Maria Rickmers (carried seven sails (skysails) on fore, main, mizzen masts, jigger mast with six sails), Potosi, R.C. Rickmers, France II (carried five sails as a bald header), and København. The Potosi's shipping line sister ship, Preussen also had five masts, but was square rigged on each mast.

The idea of building such a ship for the Laeisz fleet came from the famous Laeisz-captain Robert Hilgendorf, who was to become the Potosi's first master. His considerations and ideas had a great influence on the ship's design and he was the supervising ship officer when the huge barque was under construction. She was assigned the call sign RKGB, and as with all P-liners her hull was black with a white waterline and a red underwater ship—the colours of the German flag at that time. Author Daniel S. Parrott describes the features of the "Flying P-Liners" and says "The effectiveness of the Flying P-Line lay not only in the construction of the vessel but also in their management." He also points out that "none of the four- or five-masted Laeisz ships ever foundered or was dismasted in a Cape Horn storm in the course of countless voyages."

During World War I, she was interned in Chile, and was then given away as reparation. Under Chilean ownership, she was renamed the Flora (sign QEPD). In 1925, she caught fire in the Atlantic and eventually had to be sunk by artillery.

History 

The Potosi was launched in 1895 at the shipyard of J. C. Tecklenborg AG, Geestemünde and was used in the saltpetre trade (Salpeterfahrt) between Chile and Germany, setting record speeds in the process, due to her excellent sailing characteristics. She made twenty seven "round voyages" (Hamburg to Chile and back) under five captains between 1895 and 1914. Her first master, the legendary sea captain Robert Hilgendorf, sailed her up to 1901. Capt. Georg Schlüter (2 round voyages), Jochim Hans Hinrich Nissen (10), Johann Frömcke (3), and Robert Miethe (4) followed.

On 23 September 1914, due to the onset of the First World War, the Potosi was held at Valparaiso harbour. In 1917 while still moored in Valparaiso, she was sold to the F. A. Vinnen shipping company of Bremen, but on October 2, 1920, she was given to France as part of the vast war reparation demanded from Germany. The French government sold her to Argentina which transferred her to the Floating Docks Co. of Buenos Aires. However the ship remained unmoved in Valparaiso harbour. In 1923 she was eventually purchased by a local company González, Soffia & Cía. of Valparaíso, and renamed the Flora.

After a year of repair and refit, in December 1924, under the name of "Flora", August Oetzmann, a former Laeisz captain, sailed her to Hamburg with a cargo of nitrate in 110 days arriving on 30 March 1925. Many people of Hamburg came to welcome the old lady and wished Laeisz to purchase her from the Chilean owner but this was not possible.

The Flora sailed back to Chile (May 25) via Cardiff (July 17) taking a cargo of 800 tons of coal and 5000 tons of "patent fuel" bound for Mejillones. On September 15, 1925, en route to Cape Horn, the ship caught fire off the Patagonian coast northwest of the Falkland Islands (at 50°17.5'S, 61° 42'W). Captain A. Oetzmann decided to set course to Comodoro Rivadavia, reaching the harbour, which was merely a bay with a sandy beach, a long wooden pier, and several petrol tanks, on September 18, 1925. He anchored the ship five miles (8 km) off the coast in the roads of Comodoro Rivadavia and alerted the harbour authorities to fight the fire in the ship. As no proper equipment was available, it took three days before help came. The ordered fire engine that came was not able to extinguish the fire. Next day a huge explosion ripped her steel decks apart. The main mast fell overboard pulling the rest of the rigging with it except for the foremast. A tug tried to tow her away from the petrol tanks, and succeeded after several attempts. The Flora ran aground on the sandy beach. The seamen dropped the anchor and took everything usable from the ship. The fire kept burning while the ship's hull was repeatedly lifted by the waves and slammed into the shore. The coal-filled hull burned for some days. One morning the ship had disappeared from the beach. The Argentine cruiser Patria sank the burning hull of the former famous ship by gunfire on October 19, 1925. The wreck lies near the position .

Technical data 

The Potosi was steel-built, with a waterline length of 110 m and a total hull length of 122.42 m. The hull was 15.15 m wide and the ship had a displacement of 8,350 tons, for an effective carrying capacity of 6,400 tons. The ship had only one bulkhead in the bow section—the collision bulkhead. The ship had five masts, four of which were fully rigged, with courses, upper and lower topsails, upper and lower topgallant sails, and royals. Counting the staysails (12) including jibs (4), she carried 43 sails (24 square sails in six storeys, 12 (normally 9) staysails between the five masts, four foresails (jibs) and three fore-and-aft spanker sails including two spanker sails on two gaffs and a spanker topsail) with a total sail area of  [5,250 sq metres]. Not only the hull was steel, but also her masts ( in diameter on deck level, lower and top mast were made in one piece) and most of all spars (yards except for the royal yards, spanker boom) were constructed of steel tubing, and much of the rigging was steel cable. The only wooden spars were the four royal yards, the four topgallant masts and the two gaffs of the spanker fore-and-aft sails. She was designed as a so-called "three-island-ship", i.e. a ship that has a midship island, also called midship bridge or "Liverpool house" (the first ships equipped with that feature came from Liverpool yards), beside the forecastle and poop decks. There, inside the Liverpool house, dry and well-ventilated accommodation for crew, mates, and captain were installed, as well as the pantry and chart room. The main helm—a double rudder wheel of  diameter—stood on top, well protected against huge waves. A second helm was near the stern. Her best 24-hour-run were 376 nm in 1900 under Capt. Hilgendorf. The Potosi was manned by a crew of 40–44.

Mast names 

From bow to stern her five masts were named as follows:

Fore mast, main mast, middle mast, mizzen mast (also: after mast or "Laeisz" mast), spanker mast

In German:
 Fockmast, Großmast, Mittelmast, Kreuzmast und Besanmast

Standard nomenclature for five-masted schooners and barquentines 
Fore mast, main mast, mizzen mast, jigger mast, spanker mast

See also
List of large sailing vessels

References 

 Oliver E. Allen: Die Windjammer, Time-Life Books, Amsterdam 1980 (Original US edition: 1978)
  Björn Landström: Das Schiff, C. Bertelsmann Verlag, München 1961
 C. A. Finsterbusch: Last Voyage of the Mighty Potosi Under the German Flag. Sea Breezes Vol. XVIII (1934), pp 135–137, ill.
  Hans-Jörg Furrer: Die Vier- und Fünfmast-Rahsegler der Welt. Koehlers Verlagsges., Herford 1984, p 168,  [The four- & five-masted square-rigged ships of the world]
  Hans Blöss: Glanz und Schicksal der "Potosi" und "Preussen", Hamburgs und der Welt größte Segler.  Schmidt u. Klaunig Verlag, Kiel 1960 [Glamour and fate of the "Potosi" and "Preussen", Hamburg's and the world's largest sailers]
  Hans Georg Prager: „F. Laeisz“ vom Frachtsegler bis zum Bulk Carrier.  Koehlers Verlagsgesellschaft mbH, Herford 1974, 
  Peter Klingbeil: Die Flying P-Liner. Die Segelschiffe der Reederei F. Laeisz. Verlag "Die Hanse", Hamburg 1998 u. 2000, 
  Hermann Ostermann: Potosi - Stolz der deutschen Segelschiffsflotte. In: Das Logbuch 31. Jahrg., Brilon-Gudenhagen 1995. pp 184–189. [Potosi - Pride of the German tall ship fleet]
  Ernst Römer: Die zwei schnellsten Reisen der Potosi. In: Der Seewart, No. 6, Hamburg 1954 [The two fastest voyages of the Potosi]

External links 

  description, plans, history
  Beschreibung mit Fotos 
 Potosi at www.bruzelius.info
  Steckbrief der Potosi
 CapHorniers on F. Laeisz (and A. D. Bordes & Fils), Chile, Fotos etc.
  photograph of the Potosi under sail
  photograph of the Potosi in Hamburg harbour

1895 ships
Barques
Five-masted ships
Maritime incidents in 1925
Maritime incidents in Argentina
Merchant ships of Chile
Merchant ships of Argentina
Merchant ships of France
Ships built in Hamburg
Shipwrecks of the Argentine coast
Tall ships of Germany
Merchant ships of Germany
Windjammers